Gavin de Becker (born October 26, 1954) is an American author and security specialist, primarily for governments, large corporations, and public figures. He is the chairman of Gavin de Becker and Associates, which he founded in 1978.

Early life
Gavin de Becker is the son of Hal de Becker (1931–2021), an American dancer and prolific writer about dance.

De Becker describes his childhood as mired in violence. His parents divorced when he was three. His heroin-addict mother physically abused de Becker and his sister, and once shot his stepfather. She committed suicide when he was sixteen, and de Becker subsequently moved in with a friend from school, Miguel Ferrer, the son of the actors José Ferrer and Rosemary Clooney. He lived with the family for two years and would go on to work with Clooney as her road manager. He then worked as Elizabeth Taylor's assistant.

Career
In the 1980s, together with the United States Marshals Service, de Becker co-designed the MOSAIC Threat Assessment Systems, which is used to screen threats to justices of the Supreme Court of the United States, members of United States Congress, and senior officials of the Central Intelligence Agency. Los Angeles County Law enforcement agencies adopted MOSAIC in 1997 to help police manage and reduce spousal abuse cases that might escalate to homicide.

In 1983, he investigated a stalker for Olivia Newton-John, Sheena Easton, and Cher. He also provided his services to celebrities like Richard Burton, Dolly Parton, Jane Fonda, Joan Rivers, Victoria Principal, Tina Turner, and John Travolta.

He was twice appointed to the President's Advisory Board at the United States Department of Justice, in 1982 and 1989, and he served two terms on the Governor's Advisory Board at the California Department of Mental Health.

He has also served as an advisor for the anti-bullying resource Bystander Revolution, senior advisor to the Rand Corporation, and senior fellow at UCLA's School of Public Policy.

De Becker has shared his philosophies about prevention of violence in several appearances on The Oprah Winfrey Show, 60 Minutes, Larry King Live, 20/20, The Jordan Harbinger Show, and Sam Harris's podcast, Waking Up. He has also been profiled in Time and Newsweek, The Wall Street Journal, The New York Times, and others. De Becker's first book,  The Gift of Fear, published in 1997, was a US number 1 bestseller on The New York Times Bestseller List.

Also in 1997, his firm was hired by Bill Cosby to investigate the murder of his son, Ennis, and the threatening letters his family received after the slaying.

In 1999–2000, he assisted the United States Secret Service in the development of its guide for Protective Intelligence and
Threat Assessment Investigations.

In 2008, Oprah Winfrey dedicated a show to commemorate the ten-year anniversary of the publication of The Gift of Fear. In the last year of her show, she dedicated two hour-long shows to de Becker's work in domestic violence.

His 2008 book, Just 2 Seconds, has been described as a guide for protectors of at-risk people focusing on five key lessons for those responsible to protect others. It also includes summaries of incidents from the last several decades for training and analysis. Co-authors of the book are Tom Taylor and Jeff Marquart.

In March 2019, de Becker, who has worked for Jeff Bezos, accused the Saudi Arabian government of hacking Bezos' phone after the National Enquirer published a story about Bezos's extramarital affair. According to the BBC, de Becker, as Bezos' top security staffer, "linked the hack to The Washington Post coverage of the murder of Saudi writer Jamal Khashoggi at the Saudi consulate in Istanbul." The Daily Beast ran an op-ed, in which de Becker explained the matter of the Saudi hack in detail. Journalist Brad Stone explored whether the Saudi hack was linked in any way to a National Enquirer article about Bezos having an affair. United Nations Special Rapporteur Agnes Callamard conducted an investigation of the Saudi hack. In a public statement, she referred to information that suggested a WhatsApp account belonging to Crown Prince Mohammed bin Salman was used to deploy digital spyware on Bezos' phone, "in an effort to influence, if not silence" The Washington Post'''s reporting on the kingdom. A United Nations report noted that "the iPhone infiltration occurred from May to June in 2018, when the phones of Jamal Khashoggi's associates, Yahya Assiri and Omar Abdulaziz, were also hacked, allegedly using malware called Pegasus." The UN experts stated: "During the same period, Mr. Bezos was widely targeted in Saudi social media as an alleged adversary of the Kingdom. This was part of a massive, clandestine online campaign against Mr. Bezos and Amazon, apparently targeting him principally as the owner of The Washington Post."

Expert witness testimony
Gavin de Becker has provided expert witness testimony in many cases, including the successful prosecution of Arthur Richard Jackson, the assailant of actress Theresa Saldaña. He later led a national campaign to keep Jackson incarcerated. He also testified in the civil case against the employer of murderer Rodney Garmanian.

De Becker testified in the successful 1994 civil case arising when the tabloid Globe accused an uninvolved man of being the actual assassin of Senator Robert Kennedy (Khawar vs Globe International, Inc). Globe tried to get de Becker's testimony thrown out by a higher court; however, it was ultimately upheld by the California Court of Appeals.

De Becker advised the Los Angeles County District Attorney in the prosecution of Robert Bardo, the murderer of actress Rebecca Schaeffer, and was a consultant on the prosecution of O.J. Simpson for the murder of his ex-wife, Nicole Brown Simpson, and Ron Goldman, and the successful civil action against Simpson. His role in the O.J. Simpson cases is described in several books on the case, including those written by Marcia Clark, Christopher Darden, Jeffrey Toobin, and Daniel Petrocelli.

Personal life
De Becker has been romantically linked to singer Alanis Morissette and actress Geena Davis.

Cultural references
 Actor Miguel Ferrer, who played FBI agent Albert Rosenfield in the 1990s television show Twin Peaks, reported that his character was based on Gavin de Becker. Ferrer reportedly knew de Becker since high school.  
 De Becker gave a eulogy at Carrie Fisher's memorial service. Fisher and de Becker reportedly attended high school together and they are described as friends. "The first time I had sex was at Carrie's house," de Becker stated in the eulogy and added, "It wasn't with Carrie, but she arranged it."  
 De Becker gave the eulogy for Garry Shandling; making reference to a long-term feud with studio head Brad Grey, de Becker said, "Over the years, many people asked me, 'Why doesn't Garry have a family?' My answer was, 'Of course he had a family.' He created the Sanders family, which was as much a family as anything, and he had this family [motioning to the crowd]. And even Brad Grey had a role in his family, because every family has an uncle or a cousin who is a sociopath."

Philanthropy
 De Becker founded and personally funds The Naqaqa Giving Foundation, a charitable organization that provides medical, educational, and infrastructure support to remote villages in Fiji.
 He founded and funded Patient Pets, providing pet therapy for violently inclined patients at Atascadero State Hospital in California.
 De Becker provided the entire funding for the first Los Angeles County Domestic Violence Hotline, and along with Oprah Winfrey, makes MOSAIC domestic violence assessments available to anyone at no charge.

Writings
 
 
 
 

References

External links
 Gavin de Becker on Oprah.com
 July 2004 interview in CSO Magazine''
 September 2013 talk at St. Francis College

 

1954 births
Living people
American non-fiction crime writers
20th-century American businesspeople